Pachyballus flavipes is a species of jumping spider in the genus Pachyballus found in Africa. Its distribution includes Angola, Botswana, Cameroon, Democratic Republic of the Congo, Equatorial Guinea, Ivory Coast, Kenya, South Africa, Tanzania, Uganda and Zimbabwe. The female was first described in 1909. The female was first described in 1941 under the name Pachyballus cordiformis. However, this was declared a synonym in 2020, along with Pachyballus flavipes aurantius.

References

Salticidae
Spiders described in 1909
Spiders of Africa
Taxa named by Eugène Simon